Bewholme Vicarage, in the village of Bewholme, East Riding of Yorkshire, England, is a former vicarage designed by the architect William Burges in 1859. It is a Grade II listed building and is now a private residence.

History and description
Burges designed the vicarage in 1859. His patron appears to be unrecorded. Pevsner notes the vicarage is "a somewhat surprising house to find  in a small Holderness village". In the following year, Burges also drew up designs for the parish church but these were not executed. The vicarage is of red brick with a seven-bay frontage. Anthony Jennings describes the building as in Burges's "eccentric Northern French fairytale style". Its interior retains "many original features, including the staircase and a number of fireplaces". The building is Grade II listed.

Notes

References
 
 
 

William Burges buildings
Grade II listed buildings in the East Riding of Yorkshire
Grade II listed houses
Clergy houses in England
Houses completed in 1859
Houses in the East Riding of Yorkshire